Jane Saunders is an Australian country music singer. Her album Strangers to Your Heart was nominated for a 1995 ARIA Award for Best Country Album.

Saunders was a member of the harmony trio Saunders, Kane and Del with Genni Kane (Flying Emus) and Shanley Del. In 1995 they released Tea For Three through ABC Music.

Discography

Albums

Awards and nominations

ARIA Music Awards
The ARIA Music Awards are a set of annual ceremonies presented by Australian Recording Industry Association (ARIA), which recognise excellence, innovation, and achievement across all genres of the music of Australia. They commenced in 1987. 

! 
|-
| 1995 || Strangers to Your Heart || ARIA Award for Best Country Album ||  ||

References

Australian women singers
Living people
Year of birth missing (living people)